This is a list of ethnic organizations in the United States.

African-American
 National Association for the Advancement of Colored People (NAACP)
 National Pan-Hellenic Council (NPHC) and its historically-black member fraternities and sororities

Sudanese-American
 U.Sudan Peace & Development Foundation

Arab-American
Arab American Institute
American-Arab Anti-Discrimination Committee
Network of Arab-American Professionals

Asian-American
National Council of Asian Pacific Americans

Chinese-American
Organization of Chinese Americans

Korean American
Korean American League for Civic Action

Japanese-American
Japanese American Citizens League
Japanese American National Museum

Philippine-American
Philippine Nurses Association, Inc.

Baltic-American
 Joint Baltic American National Committee

Estonian-American
Estonian American National Council (EANC)

Latvian-American
 American Latvian Association (ALA)

Lithuanian-American
Lithuanian American Council

European-American

Belarusian Americans
Belarusian American Association (Беларуска-Амерыканскае Задзіночанне)
Belarusian Institute of America (Беларускі Інстытут Амерыкі)
Belarusian Institute of Arts and Sciences (Беларускі інстытут навукі і мастацтва)
Belarusan-American Alliance PAHONIA (Беларуска-Амерыканскае Згуртаванне ПАГОНЯ)

Czech-American
American Czech and Slovak Association

French-American
French-American Foundation

Greek-American
 American Hellenic Educational Progressive Association (its affiliate women's organization is the Daughters of Penelope and its two youth groups are the Sons of Pericles and the Maids of Athena)
 American Hellenic Institute Public Affairs Committee

Irish-American
 Ancient Order of Hibernians (Irish Catholic fraternal group)
 Emerald Society
 Friendly Sons of St. Patrick
 Friendly Sons of the Shillelagh

Italian-American 
Order Sons of Italy in America
National Italian American Sports Hall of Fame
National Italian American Foundation
National Organization of Italian American Women

Macedonian-American
 Macedonian Patriotic Organization

Polish-American
Adam Mickiewicz Library and Dramatic Circle
American Council for Polish Culture
Copernicus Foundation
National Polish-American Sports Hall of Fame
Polish American Association
Polish American Congress
Polish Roman Catholic Union of America
Polish Women's Alliance
Sons of Poland

Scandinavian-American
The American-Scandinavian Foundation

Swedish-American
American Swedish Historical Museum
American Swedish Institute
Vasa Order of America

Norwegian-American
 Independent Order of Vikings
 Norwegian-American Bygdelagenes Fellesraad
 Norwegian American Foundation
 Norwegian-American Genealogical Center & Naeseth Library
 Norwegian-American Historical Association
 Sons of Norway
 Vesterheim Norwegian-American Museum

Slovak Americans
American Czech and Slovak Association

Slovene-American
Progressive Slovene Women of America
Slovene National Benefit Society
Slovene National Benefit Society (SNPJ)
Slovenian Women's Union of America
Western Slavonic Association

Hispanic and Latino Americans
American Society of Hispanic Economists
Association of Hispanic Arts (AHA)
Association of Latino Professionals in Finance and Accounting
Association of Naval Services Officers
Hispanic National Bar Association
Hispanic Organization of Latin Actors
League of United Latin American Citizens (LULAC)
National Association of Hispanic Journalists
National Association of Latino Elected and Appointed Officials
National Society for Hispanic Professionals
National Society of Hispanic MBAs
National Society of Hispanic Physicists
Society of Hispanic Professional Engineers

Cuban-American
Cuban American National Foundation

Mexican-American
Mexican American Legal Defense and Educational Fund (MALDEF)
Mexican American Political Association
Mexican American Youth Organization
Society of Mexican American Engineers and Scientists

Jewish-American
92nd Street Y
American Jewish Committee
American Jewish Congress
B'nai B'rith
Farband
Hadassah
JCC Association - umbrella organization for many Jewish Community Centers, Young Men's Hebrew Associations (YMHAs), and Young Women's Hebrew Associations (YWHAs)
Jewish Council for Public Affairs
Jewish Federations of North America - umbrella organizations for many Jewish Federations
National Council of Jewish Women
The Workmen's Circle

Russian American
 Russian American Medical Association
 Congress of Russian Americans

Rusyn American
Carpatho-Rusyn Society

Turkish-American
American Turkish Society

See also
 List of hereditary and lineage organizations
 List of US migrant organizations of migrants from Austria-Hungary
 List of Estonian exile and émigré organizations
 List of indigenous rights organizations

Ethnic